Hedden is a surname. Notable people with the surname include:

 Gilbert Hedden, member of Oak Island treasure hunt
 Glenn Hedden, American football coach
 Mike Hedden, hockey player
 Rob Hedden, American writer and film director
 Tom Hedden, score composer

See also
 Hedden Construction Company
 Hedden County Park
 Hedden Iron Construction Company
 Lisa Heddens, Iowa State Representative
 Mount Hedden
 Nix v. Hedden